Prizm Outlets, formerly the Fashion Outlets of Las Vegas, is a  outlet shopping center in Primm, Nevada, located just off Interstate 15 at the California state line, approximately  southwest of Las Vegas. It is owned by Rialto Capital Management, on land leased from the Primm family.

The mall has 58 stores and restaurants, with some of its largest shops being outlets of Polo Ralph Lauren, Williams Sonoma, Banana Republic, and Coach. The mall is divided into two themed courts: the Urban Court and the South Beach Court. The Fashion Outlets are connected to the Primm Valley Resort.

History 
Plans for the mall were announced in September 1995. Construction began in May 1997. It began as a joint project between two shopping center developers, the Gordon Group and TrizecHahn. The mall opened on July 16, 1998, at a cost of $75 million. TrizecHahn was set to sell its interests in the mall to The Rouse Company, but the sale did not materialize. Talisman Cos., a Florida-based real estate developer focused on turning around underperforming shopping centers, acquired a stake in the property in 2000, and by the following year, was reported to be seeking full ownership.

In 2012, the mall took out a $73-million mortgage, along with a $32-million loan from Brookfield Asset Management. Brookfield foreclosed in 2016, taking ownership of the mall. By late 2017, the mall's mortgage was reportedly in default. The mortgageholder, Miami-based real estate firm Rialto Capital Management, repossessed the property in 2018. By December 2019, more than $2 million had been spent on upgrades for the mall. Rialto changed the mall's name to Prizm Outlets. In 2021, the outlets at auction was purchased by the Kohan Retail Investment Group for $1.525 million. The loan on the mall suffered a loss of 120% or $74 million dollars.

References

External links
 

Buildings and structures in Primm, Nevada
Shopping malls established in 1998
Shopping malls in Nevada
Outlet malls in the United States
Kohan Retail Investment Group